Passiflora pardifolia is a small Passiflora with very distinct leaf markings. The leaf markings of P. pardifolia look very similar to the dumbcane. The fruits of P. pardifolia looks similar to the blueberry.

pardifolia